Aberdeen Grammar School FP RFC, also known as Aberdeen Grammar, are an amateur rugby union club based in Aberdeen, Scotland. The club plays its home games at Rubislaw in the city's west end.

Honours
Scottish National League Division Two
Champions (1): 1983-84
 Aberdeen University Sevens
Champions: 1894
 Aberdeen Sevens
 Champions: 1946, 1947, 1948, 1949, 1950, 1951, 1955, 1961, 1962, 1963
 Banff Sevens
 Champions: 1993, 1995
 Ellon Sevens
 Champions: 1981, 1996
 Garioch Sevens
 Champions: 1979
 Highland Sevens
 Champions: 1950, 1955, 1986, 1988, 1995
 Howe of Fife Sevens
 Champions: 1969
 Mackie Academy F.P. Sevens
 Champions: 1977, 1982, 1986
 Moray Sevens
 Champions: 1950, 1951, 1952, 1953, 1955, 1963, 1993, 1995
 Orkney Sevens
 Champions: 1999, 2000

Notable players
 

 Donny Innes
 William Dallas "Dally" Allardice, 1947 to 1949 (8 caps)
 E.T.S Michie, the first University of Aberdeen Lions player in the 1955 British Lions tour to South Africa and also in Barbarian FC.
 Robbie Russell (27 caps)
 Andrew Wilson (2 caps)
 Johnnie Beattie
 Moray Low, 2008 to 2013

A number of former players have also gone on to play professional rugby including:

 Stuart Corsar - Glasgow Warriors, Rotherham Titans, Doncaster Knights
 Sean Crombie - Edinburgh Rugby
 Dave Millard - Glasgow Warriors
 Matt Taylor - Edinburgh Rugby, Border Reivers. Current coach for Glasgow Warriors and Scotland
 Ben Prescott - Glasgow Warriors, Rotherham Titans, Nottingham, Leinster, Northampton Saints, Cornish Pirates

References
 Bath, Richard (ed.) The Scotland Rugby Miscellany (Vision Sports Publishing Ltd, 2007 )
 Godwin, Terry Complete Who's Who of International Rugby (Cassell, 1987)
 Massie, Allan A Portrait of Scottish Rugby (Polygon, Edinburgh)

Rugby clubs established in 1893
Sports teams in Aberdeen
Scottish rugby union teams
1893 establishments in Scotland